Peter Wtewael (5 June 1596 – 16 January 1660) was a Dutch Golden Age painter.

Biography
Wtewael was born in Utrecht, son of the Dutch painter and engraver Joachim Wtewael and brother to the painter Johan Wtewael.  According to the RKD he is known as a follower of Caravaggio. He specialized in painting kitchen scenes and mythological figures. Wtewael died in 1660. One of his works is displayed at the Metropolitan Museum of Art.

References

Peter Wtewael on Artnet

1596 births
1660 deaths
Dutch Golden Age painters
Dutch male painters
Caravaggisti
Artists from Utrecht